Liam Dolan  is the Sherardian Professor of Botany in the Department of Biology at the University of Oxford and a Fellow of Magdalen College, Oxford.

Education
Dolan was educated at University College Dublin and the University of Pennsylvania where he was awarded a PhD in 1991 for genetic analysis of leaf development in the cotton plant Gossypium barbadense supervised by Scott Poethig.

Career and research
Following his PhD, Dolan spent three years doing postdoctoral research at the John Innes Centre in Norwich. After 13 years as an independent project leader in Norwich, Dolan moved to Oxford as the Sherardian Professor of Botany in 2009.

Dolan's research aims to define genetic mechanisms that control the development of plants and determine how these mechanisms have changed since plants colonised the land 500 million years ago. Dolan's research has been funded by the Biotechnology and Biological Sciences Research Council (BBSRC) and the Natural Environment Research Council (NERC).

Dolan has made outstanding contributions to our understanding of the development and evolution of land plant rooting systems. He was the first to define the precise cellular body plan of the Arabidopsis root and discovered the molecular genetic mechanism governing root hair cell differentiation. He demonstrated that this mechanism is ancient and was the first to discover the mechanism that controlled the development of the earliest land plant rooting systems that caused dramatic climate change over 400 million years ago. These pivotal discoveries illuminate our understanding of the interrelationships between the development of plants, their evolution and the Earth System.

With Alison Mary Smith, George Coupland, Nicholas Harberd, Jonathan D. G. Jones, Cathie Martin, Robert Sablowski and Abigail Amey he is a co-author of the textbook Plant Biology.

Awards and honours
Dolan was elected a Fellow of the Royal Society (FRS) in 2014. Dolan was elected a member of the European Molecular Biology Organization (EMBO) in 2009, and was awarded the President's Medal of the Society for Experimental Biology (SEB) in 2001.

References

Fellows of the Royal Society
Living people
Members of the European Molecular Biology Organization
Sherardian Professors of Botany
Fellows of Magdalen College, Oxford
Alumni of University College Dublin
University of Pennsylvania alumni
Year of birth missing (living people)